Rookie Vets is a New Zealand reality series that follows seven students at New Zealand's only veterinary school at Massey University in Palmerston North, at work and at play throughout their fifth and final year, when they're just a few short months away from graduating and their first vet jobs.

The students
The seven students are all aged 21 to 25 (as of 2005) and are:

Corinne Cooper from Canterbury
Maya Robinson from Greymouth
Fraser Davidson from Canada
William Power from Dannevirke
Estelle Louarduzzi from Waitākere City (West Auckland)
Liz Cowie from Christchurch
Bart Karalus from Hamilton

In addition to this core cast, Rookie Vets also showcases the talents of Massey Vet School staff, doctors, professors, specialists and vet nurses as well as fellow students, pet owners, farmers and a racehorse breeder- and all the animals themselves.

External links
Description on Greenstone Pictures website

Veterinary reality television series
New Zealand reality television series
TVNZ original programming